The 33rd Venice Biennale, held in 1966, was an exhibition of international contemporary art, with 36 participating nations. The Venice Biennale takes place biennially in Venice, Italy. Winners of the Gran Premi (Grand Prize) included Argentine painter Julio Le Parc, Danish sculptor Robert Jacobsen ex aequo with Étienne Martin (France), Japanese etcher Masuo Ikeda, and Italians painter Lucio Fontana, sculptor Alberto Viani, and etcher Ezio Gribaudo.

References

Bibliography

Further reading 

 
 
 
 
 
 
 
 
 
 
 
 
 
 
 
 
 
 
 
 
 
 
 
 
 
 

1966 in art
1966 in Italy
Venice Biennale exhibitions